David Popper (June 16, 1843 – August 7, 1913) was a Bohemian cellist and composer.

Life
Popper was born in Prague, and studied music at the Prague Conservatory. His family was Jewish. He studied the cello under Julius Goltermann (1825–1876), and soon attracted attention. He made his first tour in 1863; in Germany he was praised by Hans von Bülow, son-in-law of Franz Liszt, who recommended him as Chamber Virtuoso in the court of Prince von Hohenzollern-Hechingen in Löwenberg. In 1864, he premiered Robert Volkmann's Cello Concerto in A minor, Op. 33, with Hans von Bülow conducting the Berlin Philharmonic. He lost this job a couple of years later due to the prince's death.

He made his debut in Vienna in 1867, and was made principal cellist at the Hofoper. From 1868 to 1870 he was also a member of the Hellmesberger Quartet. In 1872, he married pianist Sophie Menter, a pupil of Liszt. She later joined the staff at the St. Petersburg Conservatory. In 1873, Popper resigned from his post at the Hofoper so as to continue his tours with his wife on a larger scale, giving concerts throughout Europe. Popper's and Menter's marriage was dissolved in 1886.

That year, Liszt recommended Popper for a teaching position at the newly opened string department at the Conservatory at Budapest. In Budapest, he participated in the Budapest Quartet with Jenő Hubay. He and Hubay performed chamber music on more than one occasion with Johannes Brahms, including the premiere of Brahms's Piano Trio No. 3 in Budapest, on December 20, 1886.

Popper died in Baden, near Vienna.

Among his notable students were Arnold Földesy, Jenő Kerpely, Mici Lukács, Ludwig Lebell and Adolf Schiffer (teacher of János Starker).

David Popper was one of the last great cellists who did not use an endpin. An 1880 drawing of Popper playing in a string quartet shows that although he started his cello career without using an endpin, he adopted it later in his life.

Works

Popper was a prolific composer of cello music, writing four concertos, a Requiem for three cellos and orchestra (1891) and a number of smaller pieces which are still played today, including the solo piece Tarantella. His shorter showpieces were written to highlight the unique sound and style of the cello, extending the instrument's range with pieces such as Spinnlied (Spinning Song), Elfentanz (Dance of the Elves), or the Ungarische Rhapsodie (Hungarian Rhapsody), which was published by the Friedrich Hofmeister Musikverlag. He also wrote instructional pieces. Popper is also known for his High School of Cello Playing (Op. 73), a book of cello études that is widely used by advanced cello students.

An old edition of the Grove Dictionary of Music and Musicians described him thus: "His tone is large and full of sentiment; his execution highly finished, and his style classical."
Op. 2, Five Songs for Soprano
Op. 3, Scenes From a Masked Ball, cello and piano
 No. 1, Arlequin (Harlequin) in F Major
 No. 2, Warum? (Why?) in A Major
 No. 3, Erzählung (Story) in E Major
 No. 4, Papillon (Butterfly) in D Major
 No. 5, Begegnung (Meeting) in F Major
 No. 6, Lied (Song) in G Major
Op. 5, Romance, cello and piano
Op. 8, Concerto No. 1 in D minor, cello and orchestra
Op. 10, Pieces for cello and piano
No. 1, Sarabande
No. 2, Gavotte, in D minor
No. 3, Trio-Pastoral
Op. 11, Pieces for cello and piano
No. 1, Widmung
No. 2, Humoreske
No. 3, Mazurka in G minor
Op. 12, Mazurka in D minor, cello and piano
Op. 14, Polonaise de concert, cello and piano
Chanson d'autrefois, cello and piano
Op. 16, Suite for two cellos
March for two cellos
Op. 18, Sérénade orientale, cello and piano
Op. 22, Nocturne in G major, cello and piano
Op. 23, Pieces for cello and piano
No. 1, [n. d.]
No. 2, Gavotte in D major
Op. 24, Concerto No. 2 in E minor, for cello and orchestra
Op. 27, Preludes for cello solo
No. 1, Andante serioso; [n. d.]
Op. 28, Concert-Polonaise No. 2 in F major, cello and piano
Op. 32, Pieces for cello and piano
No. 1, Nocturne
No. 2, Mazurka in A major
Op. 33, Tarantella, cello and piano
Op. 35, Four Mazurkas, cello and piano
Op. 38, Barcarolle in G major, cello and piano
Op. 39, Dance of the Elves, cello and piano
Op. 40, Three Songs (for Soprano or Tenor)
Op. 41, Nocturne, cello and piano
Op. 42, Three Nocturnes, cello and piano
Op. 43, Fantasy on Little Russian Songs, cello and piano
Op. 46, 2 Transcriptions for Cello and Piano
No. 1, Schlummerlied aus der “Mainacht" by Rimsky-Korsakov
No. 2, Träurmerei aus den “Kinderszenen” by Schumann
Op. 47, Nocturne No.4 in B Minor for cello and piano
Op. 48, Menuetto in D major, cello and piano
Op. 49, Kaiser-Marsch zur Krönung Seiner Majestät Kaiser Alexander III. for Orchestra
Op. 50, Im Walde, Suite for cello and orchestra
No. 1, Eintritt (Entrance)
No. 2, Gnomentanz (Gnomes Dance)
No. 3, Andacht (Devotion)
No. 4, Reigen (Round Dance)
No. 5, Herbstblume (Autumn Flower)
No. 6, Heimkehr (Homecoming)
Op. 51, Six Mazurkas, cello and piano
Op. 54, Spanish Dances, cello and piano
No. 1, Zur Gitarre
No. 2, Serenade
No. 3, Spanische Tänze
No. 4, L'Andalouse
No. 5, Vito
Op. 55, Pieces for cello and piano
No. 1, Spinning Song
No. 2, Hunting Piece
Op. 59, Concerto No. 3 in G major, cello and orchestra
Op. 60, Walzer Suite, cello and piano
Op. 62, Pieces for cello and piano
No. 1, La Mémoire
No. 2, La Chanson villageoise (Village Song)
No. 3, La Berceuse
Op. 64, Pieces for cello and piano
No. 1, Wie einst in schöner’n tagen (Once in Fairer Days)
No. 2, Tarantelle, in A major
No. 3, Wiegenlied (Lullaby)
Op. 65, Pieces for cello and piano
No. 1, Adagio
No. 2, Menuetto
No. 3, Polonaise
Op. 66, Requiem, for three cellos and piano (originally for three cellos and orchestra)
Op. 67, Pieces for cello and piano
No. 1, Largo
No. 2, Gavotte in D minor
No. 3, [n. d.]
No. 4, Gavotte in D minor
Op. 68, Hungarian Rhapsody, cello and piano
Op. 69, Suite for cello and piano
Largo à l'ancienne mode
Op. 71, Scottish Fantasy, cello and piano
Op. 72, Concerto No. 4 in B minor, cello and orchestra
Op. 73, High School of Cello Playing (Hohe Schule des Violoncellospiels): Forty Études for Cello Solo
Op. 74, String Quartet in C minor
Op. 75, Serenade, cello and piano
Op. 76, Zehn mittelschwere große Etüden [a/k/a Studies (Preparatory to Op. 73)]
Op. 76a, Fünfzehn leichte melodisch-rhythmische Etüden
Op. 81, Gavotte in A Major for Cello and Piano
Works with unknown or no opus number

Cadenzas for cello
 Joseph Haydn: Cello Concerto in D major
Camille Saint-Saëns: Concerto in A minor, Op. 33
Robert Volkmann: Cello Concerto in A minor
Robert Schumann: Cello Concerto in A minor, Op. 129
Molique, B.: Cello Concerto in D major
Romance in G major for cello and piano, originally for violin and piano
Chant du soir, cello and piano

Arrangements and transcriptions for cello and piano

Bach, J.S., Arie aus der D-dur Suite
Chopin, Nocturne, Op. 9, No. 2
Campioni, Minuet Pastoral
Cherubini, Ave Maria
Giordani, Caro mio ben
Handel, Largo; Sarabande
Jámbor, Nocturne, Op. 8, No. 1
Jensen, Murmelndes Lüftchen, Op. 21, No. 4
Mendelssohn, Auf Flügeln des Gesanges; Reiselied, Op. 19, No. 6
Pergolesi, Nina (Tre giorni)
Purcell, Aria
Rubinstein, Mélodie, Op. 3, No. 1
Schubert, Du bist die Ruh’; Ave Maria, Op. 52, No. 4; Der Neugierige; Sei mir gegrüsst; Litanei auf das Fest "Allerseelen"; An die Musik
Schumann, Träumerei, Op. 15, No. 7; Abendlied, Op. 85, No. 12; Schlummerlied, Op. 124, No. 16
Svendsen, Romance in G-major, op. 26
Tchaikovsky, Song Without Words, Op 2, No. 3; Chanson triste, Op. 40, No. 2; Barcarolle, Op. 37, No. 6; Perce-Niegre, Op. 37, No. 4; Chant d’automne, Op. 37, No. 10''

Notes

References

External links
 

1843 births
1913 deaths
19th-century Austrian people
19th-century classical composers
19th-century Czech people
19th-century Hungarian people
19th-century Czech male musicians
20th-century Austrian people
20th-century classical composers
20th-century Czech people
20th-century Hungarian people
20th-century Czech male musicians
Austrian expatriates in Russia
Austrian male classical composers
Austrian Romantic composers
Czech classical cellists
Czech expatriates in Hungary
Czech expatriates in Russia
Czech Jews
Czech male classical composers
Czech music educators
Czech Romantic composers
Franz Liszt Academy of Music alumni
Hungarian classical cellists
Hungarian classical composers
Hungarian male classical composers
Jewish classical composers
Musicians from Prague
Composers for cello